Shawn Bell is an American football coach and former quarterback who is currently the quarterbacks coach at Baylor University. He was previously was the head coach at multiple Texas high schools.

Playing career

High school
Bell played high school football under his father at China Spring High School and finished his prep career with 8,437 passing yards.

Baylor
Bell enrolled at Baylor University in 2002. After enjoying a red shirt year, Bell served as the Bears’ quarterback from 2003 to 2006.

Coaching career

High school
Bell began his coaching in 2007 at Stony Point High School where he coached the wide receivers. In 2008 he went to his high school alma mater and worked as an assistant under his father. In 2009 he got his first head coaching job when he worked as the head coach for Clifton High School. From 2010 to 2015 he served as the head coach for Magnolia West High School. There he led the Mustangs to the postseason every season and compiled a record of 44–27. In 2016 he went to Cedar Ridge High School where he compiled an 11–1 record.

Baylor
Bell became a part of Matt Rhule’s Baylor staff in December 2016. In 2017 he served as an offensive analyst. In March of 2018 he was promoted to the team's offensive line coach. In 2020 he was retained and moved to tight ends coach under new Baylor head coach Dave Aranda. In January 2021 he switched positions once more and was named quarterbacks coach.

Personal life
Shawn and his wife Hali are the parents of three children, Cannon, Braxton, and Saydi.

References

Year of birth missing (living people)
Living people
People from McLennan County, Texas
Players of American football from Texas
American football quarterbacks
Baylor Bears football players
Coaches of American football from Texas
High school football coaches in Texas
Baylor Bears football coaches